The 2000 Torbay Council election took place on 4 May 2000 to elect members of Torbay unitary authority in England. The whole council was up for election and the Conservative party gained overall control of the council from no overall control.

Campaign

The election was seen as being a straight fight between the Liberal Democrats and Conservatives. Before the election the Conservatives were optimistic that Torbay would be one of the councils that they would gain in the 2000 local elections and they targeted it as a council that they had to win. This emphasis on the council included two visits by William Hague the Conservative party leader. Pre-election the Liberal Democrats only had control of the council based on the casting vote of the mayor, while the Conservatives needed 5 gains to take control.

Conservative leaflets led with the theme of "Keep the Pound" but locally they accused the Liberal Democrat administration of incompetence and attacked the 22% Council Tax rise over the previous two years. The Liberal Democrats were also attacked over the council's decision to not put on any floral displays in 1999 to save money, which was seen as being an error for an area dependent on tourism. However the Liberal Democrats accused the Conservatives of playing on voters fears about asylum seekers being housed in the area.

Election result
The results saw the Conservatives win 32 of the 36 seats on the council, with the Liberal Democrats reduced to just 4 seats after having run the council since 1991. Liberal Democrat losses included the leader of the council, Anne Williams, and the mayor, John Turner. The Labour party lost both their seats on the council blaming a poor turnout at 33% and the recent rise of only 75 pence in the state pension for their defeat.

The result was seen as being an omen for the next general election, where the sitting Liberal Democrat member of parliament Adrian Sanders only had a majority of 12 over the Conservatives. However the 2001 general election would see the Liberal Democrats hold the parliamentary constituency with an increased majority.

Ward results

References

2000 English local elections
2000
2000s in Devon